Ekka is an Indian surname. Notable people with the surname include:

Albert Ekka (1942–1971), Indian soldier 
Alice Ekka (1917–1978), Indian Adivasi writer
Anosh Ekka, Indian politician
Christopher Ekka (born 1943), Indian politician
Deep Grace Ekka (born 1994), Indian field hockey player